Makoma Modjadji IV (19051980) was the fourth Rain Queen of the Balobedu tribe of the Limpopo Province of South Africa, succeeding her mother, Queen Khesetoane Modjadji III, in 1959 and reigning until her death. She married Andreas Maake, with whom she had several children.

In 1972, the apartheid regime reduced Makoma Modjadji's title to that of chieftainess, and incorporated the villages and indunas under her jurisdiction into the Lebowa and Gazankulu homelands.

She was succeeded by her eldest daughter, Mokope Modjadji.

References 

1905 births
1980 deaths
Rain Queens
Female heirs apparent
20th-century women rulers